Ozumacín Chinantec (Chinanteco de San Pedro Ozumacín) is a Chinantecan language of Mexico, spoken in northern Oaxaca in the towns of San Pedro Ozumacín, Ayotzintepec, Santiago Progreso.

Phonology

Vowels
There are ten vowels, which may be oral or nasal. A length distinction is made in writing, but is based on comparison with other Chinantec languages; the distinction is apparently being lost from Ozumacín Chinantec.

Long vowels are written double. 

Nasal vowels are written with an underscore, e.g. ji̱i̱ˊ 'bed'. This is not written after a nasal consonant, where there is no contrast with oral vowels.

The front rounded vowels arose historically from the influence of palatalized consonants on back vowels.

Consonants
Consonants and their orthography are as follows:

/p/ and /b/ are rare in native words. Apart from loans, /d/ occurs only in the enclitic daˊ, which softens an imperative. The letters c and f are used for Spanish borrowings.

/h/ becomes  before .

Tones
Ozumacín Chinantec has nine tones. They are written as follows:

Ballistic syllables are marked by a steep drop in pitch.

Unicode support
The following diacritics are used to mark Ozumacín tones. 

A sample with all tone marks:

This orthography is used in the Ozumacín Bible.

References

Chinantec languages